Balsamic vinegar is a dark, concentrated, intensely flavoured vinegar originating in Modena, Italy, made wholly or partially from grape must: freshly crushed grape juice with all the skins, seeds and stems.

The term aceto balsamico is unregulated, but there are three protected balsamic vinegars: Aceto Balsamico Tradizionale di Modena DOP (Traditional Balsamic Vinegar of Modena), Aceto Balsamico Tradizionale di Reggio Emilia DOP (Traditional Balsamic Vinegar of Reggio Emilia), and Aceto Balsamico di Modena IGP (Balsamic Vinegar of Modena). The two traditional balsamic vinegars are made the same way from reduced grape must aged for several years in a series of wooden barrels, and are produced exclusively in either the province of Modena or Reggio Emilia. The names of these two vinegars are protected by the European Union's Protected Designation of Origin, while the usually less expensive Balsamic Vinegar of Modena (Aceto Balsamico di Modena) is made from grape must blended with wine vinegar, and produced exclusively in either Modena or Reggio Emilia, with a Protected Geographical Indication status.

Balsamic vinegar contains no balsam or balsa.

Etymology
The Italian word  (from Latin , from Greek) means "balsam-like" in the sense of "restorative" or "curative"; cf. English "balm".

Classifications
There are three protected types of balsamic vinegar:

 Aceto Balsamico Tradizionale di Modena DOP
 Aceto Balsamico Tradizionale di Reggio Emilia DOP
 Aceto Balsamico di Modena IGP

Many products contain "Aceto Balsamico di Modena IGP" as an ingredient, such as glazes and other condiments.

Traditional Balsamic Vinegar of Modena DOP and Traditional Balsamic Vinegar of Reggio Emilia DOP

Only two consortia produce true traditional balsamic vinegar, Modena and neighbouring Reggio Emilia. True balsamic vinegar is made from a reduction of pressed Trebbiano and Lambrusco grapes. The resulting thick syrup, called mosto cotto in Italian, is subsequently aged for a minimum of 12 years in a battery of several barrels of successively smaller sizes. The casks are made of different woods such as chestnut, cherry, oak, mulberry, ash and juniper. True balsamic vinegar is rich, glossy, deep brown, and has a complex flavour that balances the natural sweet and sour elements of the cooked grape juice with hints of wood from the casks.

Reggio Emilia designates the different ages of their balsamic vinegar (Aceto Balsamico Tradizionale di Reggio Emilia) by label colour. A red label means the vinegar has been aged for at least 12 years, a silver label that the vinegar has aged for at least 18 years, and a gold label designates that the vinegar has aged for 25 years or more.

Modena uses a different system to indicate the age of its balsamic vinegars (Aceto Balsamico Tradizionale di Modena). A white-coloured cap means the vinegar has aged for at least 12 years and a gold cap bearing the designation extravecchio (extra-old) shows the vinegar has aged for 25 years or more.

Balsamic Vinegar of Modena

These commercial-grade products imitate the traditional product. They are made of as little as 20% grape must (and not necessarily from Modena or Reggio Emilia), with the addition of wine vinegar, colouring, caramel, and sometimes thickeners like guar gum or cornflour to artificially simulate the sweetness and thickness of the aged Aceto Balsamico Tradizionale di Modena. IGP status requires a minimum ageing period of two months, not necessarily in wooden barrels, rising to three years when labelled as invecchiato (aged). As the manufacturing process is highly industrialized, the output of a medium-sized producer may be hundreds of litres per day.
 
In 2009, the European Commission inserted the Balsamic Vinegar of Modena (Aceto Balsamico di Modena) designation in the register of IGP productions.

Condimenti that used the term balsamic
Condimento (dressing) balsamic vinegars may be labeled as condimento balsamico, salsa balsamica or salsa di mosto cotto. For those products, there is a risk of creating confusion among consumers looking for the original Balsamic Vinegar of Modena PGI, the two different Traditional Balsamic Vinegar of Modena PDO, and Traditional Balsamic Vinegar of Reggio Emilia PDO.

Condimento balsamic vinegar may be made in any of the following ways:

 Made by producers of both Balsamic Vinegar of Modena PGI or Traditional Balsamic Vinegar of Modena/Reggio Emilia PDO, by using the PGI or PDO as an ingredient. For those products, the use of the PGI and PDO as an ingredient must be clearly reported, i.e. "Glaze with Aceto Balsamico di Modena IGP". The Consortium must approve the label and the use of the PGI's/PDO's name.
 Made by the same method as the vinegars, but by producers outside Modena and Reggio Emilia provinces and not made under consortium supervision. No reference to the PDO/PGI can be made for those products, and they cannot use the geographical names Modena or Reggio Emilia.

As there are no official standards or labelling systems to designate condimento balsamic vinegar, it can be hard to tell their quality based on the packaging alone.

Traditional processes

Traditional balsamic vinegar is produced from the juice of just-harvested white grapes (typically, Trebbiano grapes) boiled down to reach a minimum sugar concentration of 30% (brix) or more in the must, which is then fermented with a slow ageing process which further concentrates the flavours. The flavour intensifies over the years, with the vinegar being stored in wooden casks, becoming sweet, viscous and very concentrated. During this period, a portion evaporates: it is said that this is the "angels' share", a term also used in the production of bourbon whiskey, Scotch whisky, wine and other alcoholic beverages.

None of the product may be withdrawn until the end of the minimum aging period of 12 years. At the end of the aging period (12, 18 or 25 years), a small portion is drawn from the smallest cask, and each cask is then topped up with the contents of the preceding (next larger) cask. Freshly reduced cooked must is added to the largest cask, and in every subsequent year, the drawing and topping up process is repeated. This process where the product is distributed from the oldest cask and then refilled from the next oldest vintage cask is called solera or in perpetuum.

Uses

In Emilia-Romagna, tradizionale vinegar is most often served in drops on top of chunks of Parmigiano Reggiano and mortadella as an antipasto. It is also used sparingly to enhance steaks, eggs, or grilled fish, as well as on fresh fruit such as strawberries and pears and on plain crema (custard) gelato. Tradizionale vinegar may be sipped from a tiny glass to conclude a meal.

Contemporary chefs use both Traditional Balsamic Vinegar of Modena PDO and Balsamic Vinegar of Modena PGI  sparingly in simple dishes where the balsamic vinegar's complex tastes are highlighted, using it to enhance dishes like scallops or shrimp, or on simple pastas and risottos.

References

External links 

 Consortium for Protection of Balsamic Vinegar of Modena
 Consortium for Protection of Traditional Balsamic Vinegar of Modena

Italian cuisine
Mediterranean cuisine
Modena
Reggio Emilia
Salad dressings
Vinegar